The Trentino-Alto Adige/Südtirol regional election of 1964 took place on 15 November 1964.

Following inter-ethnic tensions with the German minority, the Christian Democracy formed an organic Centre-left majority with the Democratic Socialists and the Socialists, joined by the FPÖ-sister party THP.

Results

Regional Council

Source: Trentino-Alto Adige/Südtirol Region

Trentino

Source: Trentino-Alto Adige/Südtirol Region

South Tyrol

Source: Trentino-Alto Adige/Südtirol Region 

1964 elections in Italy
Elections in Trentino-Alto Adige/Südtirol